Huai Sam Phat railway station is a railway station located in Huai Sam Phat Subdistrict, Prachaksinlapakhom District, Udon Thani Province.

References 

Railway stations in Thailand
Udon Thani province